The 2010 Tour de France was the 97th edition of the Tour de France cycle race, one of cycling's Grand Tours.

The total length was  including  in time-trials. Following an opening prologue time trial, the first three stages passed through the Netherlands and Belgium on routes designed to replicate some features of the spring classic cycle races. This included seven cobblestone sectors totaling , the longest distance of cobblestones in the Tour since 1983, on stage 3. There were six mountain stages, three of them with mountaintop finishes, and two medium mountain stages. In the 100th anniversary year of their first inclusion on the Tour, the emphasis was on the Pyrenees, with two ascents of the Col du Tourmalet.

The Tour was initially won by Alberto Contador, who was later revealed to have failed a doping test. After a series of events, the CAS finally decided in February 2012 that Contador lost his results from 2010, declaring Andy Schleck the new winner. Schleck also won the young riders' competition for the third time running. France's Anthony Charteau won the polkadot jersey as the King of the Mountains whilst the Italian sprinter Alessandro Petacchi won the green jersey for victory in the points classification.

Teams

Twenty-two teams with a total of nine riders accepted invitations to participate in the 2010 Tour de France. Sixteen of the teams were covered by a September 2008 agreement with the Union Cycliste Internationale, including two no longer part of the UCI ProTour. Six other teams, including the four ProTour teams not guaranteed a place, accepted their invitations.

The teams entering the race were:

Qualified teams

 
 
  
 
  
 
 
 
 
 
 
 
 
 
 
 

Invited teams

  
  
 
 
 
 

: Teams not part of the ProTour.

Pre-race favourites
Before the start of the race, Contador was the overall race favourite. Among the other favourites were Andy Schleck, Cadel Evans, and Lance Armstrong. The US media, led by the US Tour broadcaster Versus, pitched the race as a showdown between Contador and Armstrong, both multi-tour champions going in. It has been since pointed out, however, that Armstrong's chances were perhaps exaggerated prior to the race; the two had already met that year in a two-day race in March at the Critérium International and Contador had finished four minutes ahead of Armstrong.

Route and stages

The official Tour presentation was held on 14 October 2009. It was the third consecutive Grand Tour to begin in the Netherlands, as the 2009 Vuelta a España began in Assen, and the 2010 Giro d'Italia in Amsterdam. The race consisted of nine flat stages, six mountain stages (three summit finishes), four medium mountain stages, and two individual time trials, one of them being the opening prologue in Rotterdam.

Race overview

The race started in Rotterdam with a 9 km prologue won by Fabian Cancellara. Sylvain Chavanel claimed the lead from Cancellara on Stage 2, after a massive crash which involved many riders, most notably Andy Schleck, a contender for overall victory, and Alessandro Petacchi. The riders in the peloton chose to wait for the fallen riders. However, on the cobbles of Stage 3, Cancellara retook the overall lead as Chavanel struggled. Fränk Schleck had to retire from the race, having sustained a collarbone fracture on a crash which delayed many of the riders in the peloton, including Contador and Armstrong who were hopeful of finishing high in the general classification. A number of their rivals, including Andy Schleck, Cadel Evans and Ryder Hesjedal, were ahead of the crash and so were able to gain a time advantage. Green jersey contender Thor Hushovd won the stage and took the lead in the Points classification as Geraint Thomas, who was riding in his second Tour, finished 2nd and took the white jersey from Tony Martin, who had been wearing it since the Prologue.

On Stage 7 Chavanel again raced away from the field to take his second stage win and maillot jaune of the 2010 edition of the race, whilst Andy Schleck took the young riders' classification lead from Thomas. Evans took the yellow jersey from Chavanel the following day on Stage 8, and in turn lost the lead to Schleck on Stage 9 following a rest day.

In Stage 11, Petacchi took the green jersey from Hushovd; Mark Cavendish won the stage, but his leadout rider, Mark Renshaw, was disqualified from the Tour after headbutting Julian Dean while leading out his teammate.

On Stage 15 Schleck was race leader and pressing the pace over the day's final climb of Port de Bales when he threw his chain. Contador and Denis Menchov immediately moved to the front and attacked, pressing the advantage over the crest of the climb and all the way back down into Bagneres-de-Luchon. They were aided by Sammy Sanchez and two others making a group of five riders, all looking to gain time. Schleck chased hard, but had no other riders to help bridge the gap. By stage's end, he had lost the yellow jersey and 39 seconds to Contador. Contador, who now had an eight-second lead in the race, met with a mixed reception as he received the yellow jersey on the podium at the end of the stage.

Contador said that he did not know that Schleck had technical trouble, and that he had already launched an attack by then, but review of the race shows that he was chasing an attack by Schleck, that he nearly struck Schleck as he moved past him, and that he looked back repeatedly on the climb while Schleck struggled to close down the gap. Hours later, he apologised for the incident. Although he was criticised by Sean Kelly and a number of riders both past and current, he also found support from the likes of Bernard Hinault, Miguel Induráin, Eddy Merckx and Laurent Jalabert. Cervélo team owner Gerard Vroomen commented: "Contador just gained a great chance to win, but he lost the chance to win greatly." This same stage saw Anthony Charteau take the lead in the King of the Mountains competition from fellow Frenchman Jérôme Pineau.

The 17th stage was considered this Tour's queen stage. The first-category Col de Marie-Blanque and Col du Soulor climbs preceded a grueling summit finish atop of the Hors Catégorie Col de Tourmalet, the second ascent of the Tourmalet of this year's Tour. The stage turned into a battle between Andy Schleck and Alberto Contador. The tour's top two riders separated themselves from the field on the final climb. Schleck launched numerous attacks upon Contador in the final 15 kilometres, but was unable to separate from him. Contador coolly stayed on Schleck's wheel, and attacked as well once, but was pulled back by Schleck. Schleck went on to take the stage over Contador, who seemed happy to follow Schleck across the line while holding a seemingly unassailable lead in the GC. Meanwhile, Anthony Charteau confirmed his hold on the Polka-dot Jersey, as the Tour completed its final categorised climbs.

On stage 18 Petacchi took the green jersey from Hushovd for the final time. The points classification was hotly contested between these two riders and the jersey changed hands a half dozen times between them throughout the race.

Stage 19 was the final time trial. It was widely expected that Contador would increase his lead over Schleck, who in the past had struggled in this discipline, but the initial going surprised all as Schleck set a high pace that Contador had difficulty matching. By the first time check Schleck had picked up six seconds, cutting Contador's overall lead to just two seconds on the road. By the second time check Contador had recovered his losses and extended his lead over Schleck by six seconds. Over the final third of the course Contador extended his advantage, gaining an additional twenty-five seconds on his rival for an overall gain of thirty-one seconds for the stage. Fabian Cancellara, the Olympic and World Time Trial Champion, won the stage by seventeen seconds over runner-up Tony Martin. In addition Denis Menchov was able to overtake Samuel Sánchez for third place overall, while Ryder Hesjedal was able to move in front of Joaquim Rodríguez for the seventh place slot in the GC. Contador's first-place lead increased to 39 seconds, essentially guaranteeing him the victory.

The final stage was won by Cavendish, who became the first winner of consecutive Champs-Élysées stages. The Manx sprinter won five stages, more than any other rider in 2010 Tour, taking his career tally to 15 stage wins. Original tour winner Alberto Contador finished surrounded by his Astana teammates. This was his third Tour de France in three consecutive entries, after having won it in 2007 and 2009. Schleck finished in second place for the second year in a row (later to receive the victory after Contador's positive test and subsequent ban) and Menchov completed the podium in third place. Petacchi won the Green jersey. His second-place finish in the final stage gave him enough points to finish just above Cavendish and Hushovd. France's Charteau won the Polka dot jersey.

Doping

In September 2010, Contador revealed that a urine sample he had given on 21 July, a rest day in the 2010 Tour de France, had contained traces of clenbuterol. He has stated, due to the number of other tests he passed and that only a tiny amount of the substance was detected in the one he failed, that food contamination was to blame. The UCI issued a statement reporting that the concentration was 50 picograms per millilitre, and that this was 1/40 the minimum standards of detection capability required by WADA, and that further scientific investigation would be required. In late January 2011, the Spanish Cycling Federation proposed a one-year ban, but it subsequently accepted Contador's appeal and cleared him of all charges. The UCI and the World Anti-Doping Agency each referred the decision independently to the Court of Arbitration for Sport in March 2011, but Contador remained free to ride until their ruling was made. The hearing was delayed until after the 2011 Tour de France at Contador's request and then deferred to November 2011. On 6 February 2012, the CAS stripped Contador of the 2010 title, making Andy Schleck the winner.

Armstrong was stripped of all his professional results from August 1998 to August 2012, including his seven Tour titles on 22 October 2012. Armstrong's finish in the 2010 Tour—originally 23rd; 22nd at the time of its stripping—was also stripped. In January 2013, Armstrong admitted to doping in an interview with Oprah Winfrey. Although he admitted to have doped in his seven wins, he denied doping in the 2009 and 2010 Tours. Regardless, Armstrong was stripped of his finishes in those two Tours as well, because his blood values indicated that he doped. USADA's report stated that "The likelihood of Armstrong's blood values from the 2009 and 2010 Tours de France occurring naturally is less than one in a million".

On 10 July 2014, a UCI press release detailing various athlete sanctions specified that Menchov had been banned (for a period of two years) until 9 April 2015 due to adverse biological passport findings. Due to this, he has been disqualified from the 2009, 2010 and 2012 Tours de France.

In May 2011, newspaper l'Equipe published a list of cyclists and an index that indicated the suspicion for doping use.

Classification leadership and minor prizes

There were four main individual classifications contested in the 2010 Tour de France, as well as a team competition. The most important was the general classification, which was calculated by adding each rider's finishing times on each stage. There were no time bonuses given at the end of stages for this edition of the Tour. If a crash had happened within the final  of a stage, not including time trials and summit finishes, the riders involved would have received the same time as the group they were in when the crash occurred. The rider with the lowest cumulative time was the winner of the general classification and was considered the overall winner of the Tour. The rider leading the classification wore a yellow jersey.

The second classification was the points classification. Riders received points for finishing in the highest positions in a stage finish, or in intermediate sprints during the stage. The points available for each stage finish were determined by the stage's type. The leader was identified by a green jersey.

The third classification was the mountains classification. Most stages of the race included one or more categorised climbs, in which points were awarded to the riders that reached the summit first. The climbs were categorised as fourth-, third-, second- or first-category and hors catégorie, with the more difficult climbs rated lower. The leader wore a white jersey with red polka dots.

The final individual classification was the young rider classification. This was calculated the same way as the general classification, but the classification was restricted to riders who were born on or after 1 January 1985. The leader wore a white jersey.

The final classification was a team classification. This was calculated using the finishing times of the best three riders per team on each stage; the leading team was the team with the lowest cumulative time. The number of stage victories and placings per team determined the outcome of a tie. The riders in the team that lead this classification were identified with yellow number bibs on the back of their jerseys.

In addition, there was a combativity award given after each stage to the rider considered, by a jury, to have "made the greatest effort and who has demonstrated the best qualities of sportsmanship". No combativity awards were given for the time trials and the final stage. The winner wore a red number bib the following stage. At the conclusion of the Tour, Sylvain Chavanel was given the overall super-combativity award.

There were also two special awards each with a prize of €5000, the Souvenir Henri Desgrange, given in honour of Tour founder and first race director Henri Desgrange, and the Souvenir Jacques Goddet, given in honour of the second director Jacques Goddet, both to the first rider to pass the summit of the Col du Tourmalet on stages 17 and 16 respectively. Andy Schleck won the Henri Desgrange and Christophe Moreau won the Jacques Goddet.

 In stage 1, David Millar, who was third in the points classification, wore the green jersey, as Fabian Cancellara held the general classification as well as the points classification, and Tony Martin, who was second in the points classification, was wearing the white jersey.
 In stage 3, Alessandro Petacchi wore the green jersey, as Sylvain Chavanel held the general classification as well as the points classification.
 In stages 10 through 15, Robert Gesink wore the white jersey, as Andy Schleck held the general classification as well as the youth competition.
 Alberto Contador wore the yellow jersey from the end of the 15th stage on, but his victory was later stripped due to his positive test. Andy Schleck was second in the general classification during these stages.

Final standings

General classification

Points classification

Mountains classification

Young rider classification

Team classification

References

Bibliography

External links

 

 
2010 in Belgian sport
2010 in Dutch sport
2010 in French sport
2010 UCI World Ranking
2010
July 2010 sports events in Europe